The UNAF Club Cup is a tournament designed by the Union of North African Football Federations (UNAF) that puts together the top three best finishers of the domestic leagues and the two finalists of the domestic cups around North Africa. The tournament has representatives from Algeria, Egypt, Libya, Morocco and Tunisia.

History
The idea of creating this competition was proposed by the UNAF in 2011 by merging both the North African Cup of Champions and the North African Cup Winners Cup in a single competition. The tournament planned to start in September 2011, however it was postponed because financial problem of the principal sponsor of the competition, Nessma TV. In 2015 the competition took part for the first time.

Format
The competition played in a round-robin tournament determined the final standings.

Finals

 A round-robin tournament determined the final standings.

Records and statistics

Winning clubs

Winners by country

See also
North African Cup of Champions (defunct)
North African Cup Winners Cup (defunct)
North African Super Cup (defunct)

References

External links
  unaf official website

 
UNAF clubs competitions
International club association football competitions in Africa